Chuck and the First Peoples Kitchen is a documentary food and culture television series whose premiere first broadcast was on the Aboriginal Peoples Television Network (APTN) in 2020; in English on September 10; in French on September 14. Canadian celebrity chef Chuck Hughes hosts the show, visiting Canadian indigenous communities where he learns supply techniques and traditional recipes with the community members. The show is filmed in French and English. The show airs on APTN in French and in English.

Synopsis 
Eager to learn more about culinary traditions used all over Turtle Island, Chef Chuck Hughes is welcomed into various Indigenous Communities in hopes of expanding his cooking horizons. Chuck is introduced to supply techniques, is taught traditional recipes, and becomes a privileged witness to precious knowledge shared by Indigenous peoples on their land.

Episodes

Season 1

Filming locations 

 Iqaluit, an Inuit community in Nunavut territory, Canada
 Waswanipi, a Cree community in Quebec, Canada
 Pikogan, an Algonquin community in Quebec, Canada
 Manawan, an Atikamekw community in Quebec, Canada
 Kitigan Zibi, an Algonquin community in Quebec, Canada
 Wikwemikong on Manitoulin Island in northern Ontario, Canada
 Six Nations, in Ontario, Canada
 Toronto, Ontario, Canada
 Gesgapegiac, a Mi’kmaq community in Quebec, Canada
 Scotchfort, an Abegweit community on Prince Edward Island, Canada
 Miawpukek, Newfoundland and Labrador, Canada

Broadcast 
Chuck and the First Peoples Kitchen is a series produced by Andicha Média, and broadcast in English and in French on APTN.

See also
 Anthony Bourdain: No Reservations
 Anthony Bourdain: Parts Unknown
 Gordon Ramsay: Uncharted

References 

 CBC News, Indigenous chefs teach Chuck Hughes about culture and cuisine in new cooking travel show
 CFNR Network, Celebrity Chef and Host of APTN’s “Chuck and the First Peoples Kitchen”, Chuck Hughes (radio interview)
 Chatelaine Magazine, Chef Sheila Flaherty on Inuit cuisine
 CJAD Radio, Interview with Chuck Hughes
 Nunatsiaq News, Chef Chuck Hughes’ new show visits Iqaluit

External links
 English website: https://chuckfirstpeopleskitchen.com/
 French website: https://chucketlacuisinedespremierspeuples.com/
 

2020 Canadian television series debuts
2020s Canadian cooking television series
Aboriginal Peoples Television Network original programming
English-language television shows
French-language television programming in Canada
First Nations television series